Isolona is a genus of flowering plants in the family Annonaceae. There are 21 species native to Africa. They occur in humid habitat types.

Species include:
 Isolona campanulata Engler & Diels
 Isolona capuronii Cavaco & Keraudren
 Isolona cauliflora Verdc.
 Isolona congolana (De Wild. & T. Durand) Engl. & Diels
 Isolona cooperi Hutchinson & Dalziel
 Isolona deightonii Keay
 Isolona dewevrei Engl. & Diels.
 Isolona ghesquierei Cavaco & Keraudren
 Isolona heinsenii Engl. & Diels
 Isolona hexaloba Engler
 Isolona humbertiana Ghesq. ex Cavaco & Keraudr.
 Isolona lebrunii Boutique
 Isolona letestui Pellegr.
 Isolona linearis Isolona madagascariensis (A.DC.) Engl.
 Isolona maitlandii Keay
 Isolona perrieri Diels
 Isolona pilosa Diels
 Isolona pleurocarpa Diels
 Isolona thonneri (De Wild. & T.Durand) Engl. & Diels
 Isolona zenkeri Engl.

References

 
Annonaceae genera
Taxonomy articles created by Polbot